Marie-Jo Thiel (born 7 May 1957, Etting) is a French theologian, medical doctor, and professor of ethics. She is a professor of moral theology, specialising in ethics and bioethics, at the University of Strasbourg. Her research focuses on topics such as ageing, death, medical ethics, and sexual abuse in the Catholic Church. She is also the founder and former director of the European Centre for Studies and Research in Ethics and former president of the European Society for Catholic Theology.

Biography 
Thiel was born on 7 May 1957 in Etting, Moselle, France. She studied Medicine at the University of Strasbourg and became an intern at the Roman Catholic Diocese of Nancy in 1980. She obtained her PhD in Medicine in 1983 from Strasbourg, followed by a PhD in Catholic Theology from the University of Metz in 1989. Her second doctoral thesis was called "Au clair obscur de la vie : pour un statut de l'embryon humain" (In the chiaroscuro of life: Status of the human embryo). This was given très honorable avec félicitations by the jury. She then began teaching ethics and bioethics at Metz and Nancy; at Metz, she became a maître de conférence. While a lecturer, she finished a diploma in European Health Policies in 1993 at the Seminary in Nancy, followed by a Habilitation in Ethics and Moral Theology at University of Strasbourg in 1998. Her habilitation thesis was called "Atouts de l'éthique systématique" (Assets of Systematic Ethics), which would inform her academic focus moving forward.

Career
Thiel joined the Faculty of Catholic Theology at Strasbourg in 1999, where she quickly established an interdisciplinary program in ethics. A Master's degree in ethics was also started, with her serving as Director. This research formed the basis for the European Centre for Studies and Research in Ethics (CEERE), which she founded in 2005 in connection to Strasbourg's Faculty of Social Sciences.

Her contacts and research activities in collaboration with Yale University in the United States led Thiel to begin a summer school on interdisciplinary European Ethics in the summer of 2013. The summer school drew 41 students from 22 countries over five continents.

Thiel has been studying sexual abuse in the Catholic Church since the 1990s. Her work as a physician and a theologian meant she was approached by sexual abuse victims; this inspired her to look more deeply at the issue. In 2017, her work led Pope Francis to appoint her a member of the Pontifical Academy for Life as part of the organisation's reform. New statues were introduced to change the lifetime membership into 5-year renewable terms, and to allow appointments to people regardless of religion. She has also advised the French Episcopal Conference for more than 20 years in its efforts to fight sexual abuse within the Church. In 2018, she published a 700-page, in-depth study on sexual abuse of minors within the Catholic Church. This book is called The Catholic Church facing sexual abuse and was published by Bayard Presse. Throughout her studies, she has stressed the importance of supporting and believing victims of sexual abuse, and uses their accounts in her writing.

Thiel started the Journées Internationales d'Ethique (International Symposium on Ethics) in Strasbourg in about 2008. She also edits the CEERE newsletter. In addition to her books, she has published articles in several international journals. Thiel teaches and writes in English, German, and French. Though she mainly teaches in France, she has also taught in the United States, Canada, and Germany.

Throughout her work at the intersection of ethics and the Church, she has stepped forward to share her beliefs: she has criticised the Church's ban on contraceptives and classifying homosexuality as a sin, and supported vaccines to help prevent the COVID-19 pandemic. Thiel believes the Church has to be adaptive in the face of changing issues and firmly believes the Church does not intend to be "behind the times." She has also expressed support for assisted suicide, for which she was criticised by other Pontifical Academy members.

Honours and awards

Memberships

Selected publications
 1992: Avancer en vie. Le troisième âge. 
 1999: Pratiquer l'analyse éthique. Étudier un cas, examiner un texte. with X. Thévenot. 
 2006: Entre malheur et espoir. Annoncer le handicap, la maladie, la mort. 
 2009: Donner, recevoir un organe. Droit, dû, devoir. 
 2010: Quand la vie naissante se termine. 
 2011: Semences de vie. Trente ans d’expérience en assistance médicale à la procréation with André Clavert. 
 2012: Ethical Challenges of Ageing. 
 2013: Au nom de la dignité de l'être humain. 
 2014: La santé augmentée : réaliste ou totalitaire? 
 2016: Souhaitable vulnérabilité? 
 2019: L'église catholique face aux abus sexuels sur mineurs. 
 2022: Abus sexuels – Ecouter, enquêter, prévenir with Anne Danion-Grilliat and Frederic Trautmann.

References 

1957 births
21st-century French philosophers
Bioethicists
Chevaliers of the Légion d'honneur
Living people
Catholic philosophers
University of Strasbourg alumni
People from Moselle (department)
Academic staff of the University of Strasbourg
French theologians
21st-century French Catholic theologians
21st-century French theologians
French Roman Catholics
French ethicists
Roman Catholic moral theologians
French women physicians
21st-century French physicians